Panulirus is a genus of spiny lobsters in the family Palinuridae, including those species which have long flagella on their first antennae.

Species
It contains the following species:

References

External links

Achelata
Taxa named by Adam White (zoologist)
Decapod genera